Europa Recordings was a British Europop record label established in 2006 by Matt Jagger.  It was an imprint of Universal-Island Records, part of the Universal Music corporation.

Their first release "From Paris To Berlin" by Infernal was a number 2 hit in the British singles chart in May 2006.  Europa was run in conjunction with the Apollo Recordings imprint, but both were closed down by Universal in 2007.

References 

British record labels